Dance Your Ass Off (also rendered in a censored form as Dance Your A** Off for broadcast television mentions and promotions) is a reality competition series on the Oxygen Network hosted by Marissa Jaret Winokur in the first season, then Melanie Brown in season two. Similar to the set up of Dancing with the Stars competitors are paired with a professional dancers in hope of impressing judges and the viewing audience. However, each of the twelve contestants are also hoping to lose weight during the process. It premiered on June 29, 2009. The medical doctor is Rob Huizenga from The Biggest Loser. The season premiere brought in 4.3 million viewers making it the most watched show in history of Oxygen Network. In the judges panel are Danny Teeson, a lifestyle coach and dancing expert, actress Lisa Ann Walter, and professional dancer Mayte Garcia, who only appeared as a guest judge for a week in season 2.

Seasons

Season 1

Season 2

International broadcasters

Australia
Australia's Nine Network began airing Dance Your Ass Off on July 21, 2009. The first episode attained a low 797,000 viewers (compared with numbers of 1.4-1.6 million viewers on the other two major commercial networks) and coming third out of fifth in overall ratings for the night by a substantial margin. Dance Your Ass Off got some of the lowest numbers the network has seen before in prime-time. The Nine Network removed the show from their schedule and replaced it with episodes of 20 to 1.

There was much criticism to the Nine Network airing Dance Your Ass Off, considering that the Oxygen Network is a low-viewed niche cable network in the United States that only targets young women exclusively with their programming, whereas Nine is a major free-to-air broadcaster for the mass-market. Within three weeks the programme was moved to Nine's multicast digital channel Go! from August 15, 2009, ending October 17 with the finale episode.

The show was panned in its reviews as well in Australia prior to its premiere, with websites such as TV Tonight giving it a rating of a ½-star out of a possible 5 stars.

International adaptations
There have been a number of local version of Dance Your Ass Off around the world based on the original US format. Licensing of the format is handled by NBCUniversal. Vietnam is the only country airing its version of Dance Your Ass Off while other countries are no longer airing its version.

References

External links
Official site
Dance Your Ass Off Video & Gallery

 

2009 American television series debuts
Dance competition television shows
Oxygen (TV channel) original programming
2010 American television series endings
2000s American reality television series
2010s American reality television series
English-language television shows
Television series by Magical Elves